Bastian Knittel (born 8 August 1983) is a German tennis player playing on the ATP Challenger Tour. He reached his career-high ATP singles ranking of world No. 157 in February 2011.

Challenger finals

Singles: 2 (1–1)

Doubles: 4 (2–2)

References

External links
 
 

1983 births
Living people
German male tennis players
Sportspeople from Stuttgart
Tennis people from Baden-Württemberg
20th-century German people
21st-century German people